State Route 176 (SR-176) is the designation given to the partially completed roadway named Vineyard Connector Road.

Route description
SR-176 begins at SR-114 on the eastern side of Vineyard and heads west. The road crosses the FrontRunner and Union Pacific Railroad tracks via an overpass before terminating at Main Street.

History

The completed highway will be located mostly, if not entirely, within the Town of Vineyard. The completed portion has been signed in both directions (as "north" and "south"). It was officially designated State Route 176 during the 2017 session of the Utah State Legislature.

Major intersections

References

176
 176